Last Flight is a 2014 Chinese supernatural action thriller film based on a novel by Singaporean novelist and actress Megan Tay. starring Ed Westwick and Zhu Zhu. The film was directed by Vincent Zhou. The screenplay was written by Vincent Zhou and Peter Cameron.

Plot
Disaster waits for those traveling aboard the last red-eye flight from a secluded Pacific island. The captain and chief flight attendant fight to save their passengers from an otherworldly storm of chaos and paranoia threatening their doomed aircraft.

Cast
Ed Westwick
Zhu Zhu
Yin Zheng

Reception
The film grossed US$5.9 million in China  and remained in the nation's Top Ten for three weeks.

Sequel

The Sequel titled Lost in the Pacific was released on January 29, 2016.

References

External links
 

2014 action thriller films
Chinese action thriller films
Hong Kong action thriller films
Chinese aviation films
Films shot in Bangkok
Chinese disaster films
2010s Hong Kong films